A development easement is a legal agreement by which a landowner surrenders the right to develop a designated parcel of property. Some local and state governments have programs to acquire development easements from private landowners to prevent conversion of farmland to other uses.

References

Law of the United States